Lusitanops sigmoideus is a species of sea snail, a marine gastropod mollusk in the family Raphitomidae.

Description

Distribution
This species occurs in the Northern Atlantic Ocean.

References

 Revision of the north east Atlantic bathyal and abyssal Turridae (Mollusca, Gastropoda). Journal of Molluscan Studies Supplement, 8 1980: 1-119
 Gofas, S.; Le Renard, J.; Bouchet, P. (2001). Mollusca. in: Costello, M.J. et al. (eds), European Register of Marine Species: a check-list of the marine species in Europe and a bibliography of guides to their identification. Patrimoines Naturels. 50: 180-213.

External links
 
 Intergovernmental Oceanographic Commission (IOC) of UNESCO. The Ocean Biogeographic Information System (OBIS)

sigmoideus
Gastropods described in 1980